38P/Stephan–Oterma (also known as Comet Stephan–Oterma) is a periodic comet with an orbital period of 38 years. It fits the classical definition of a Halley-type comet with (20 years < period < 200 years). It was discovered on 22.9 January 1867, by Jérôme Eugène Coggia at Marseilles Observatory, France. On 25.86 January Édouard Stephan confirmed it was a comet. It was recovered in 6 November 1942 by the Finnish astronomer Liisi Oterma.

38P/Stephan–Oterma last came to perihelion on November 10, 2018. It was recovered by Pan-STARRS on June 24, 2017 while 5.3 AU from the Sun. The next perihelion passage is August 28, 2056.

Orbit
It has perihelion near the orbit of Mars and has aphelion near the orbit of Uranus.  Acting like a centaur-hybrid, between the years 1982 and 2067, this object will make close approaches to the giant planets Jupiter, Saturn, and Uranus. If this object did not have a coma and (for some definitions) had a perihelion beyond Jupiter's (5 AU), it would be considered a centaur.

References

External links
 Orbital simulation from JPL (Java) / Ephemeris
 Gary W. Kronk's Cometography page for 38P

Periodic comets
Halley-type comets
0038
Comets in 2018
18670122